Zaeera pulcherrima is a species of beetle in the family Cerambycidae. It was described by Nonfried in 1894. It is known from Papua New Guinea.

References

Pteropliini
Beetles described in 1894